JETCO, officially Joint Electronic Teller Services Limited is a network of automatic teller machines in Hong Kong and Macau.

History
JETCO was founded by the Hong Kong Branch of the Bank of China (now Bank of China (Hong Kong)) in 1982 along with the Bank of East Asia, Chekiang First Bank, Shanghai Commercial Bank and Wing Lung Bank, and at present covers all banks in Hong Kong and Macau, except for HSBC and Hang Seng Bank, which uses a separate system known as ETC (易通財).

JETCO connects with the UnionPay network in Mainland China: JETCO cardholders can withdraw RMB cash at UnionPay machines in a number of major cities in Mainland China, while UnionPay cardholders can withdraw HK$ cash (no more than HK$5,000 per day) at JETCO machines in Hong Kong. However, after 1 January 2006, JETCO cardholders can no longer withdraw cash at UnionPay ATMs in Mainland since JETCO and UnionPay could not reach an agreement. Bank of East Asia has now linked its mainland ATMs to the JETCO network to allow users of the JETCO network to withdraw RMB cash on the mainland and mainland-based banks and others in Hong Kong have linked their ATMs in Hong Kong to the UnionPay network. Additionally, many banks in Hong Kong now issue UnionPay debit and credit cards for mainland use.

Members
JETCO is the primary network of the following banks listed below:

Hong Kong

Bank of China (Hong Kong)
Bank of Communications
Bank of Communications Hong Kong Branch
Bank of East Asia
China Construction Bank (Asia)
China Merchants Bank
Chiyu Banking Corporation
Chong Hing Bank
Citibank (Hong Kong)
CITIC Ka Wah Bank

Dah Sing Bank
DBS Bank
Fubon Bank
Industrial and Commercial Bank of China (Asia)
Nanyang Commercial Bank
Public Bank (Hong Kong)
Shanghai Commercial Bank
Standard Chartered Hong Kong
OCBC Wing Hang Bank
Wing Lung Bank

Macau
Banco Comercial de Macau
Banco Nacional Ultramarino
Banco Weng Hang
China Construction Bank
Bank of China
Luso International Bank
Industrial and Commercial Bank of China (Macau)
Tai Fung Bank

See also
ATM usage fees

External links
Official homepage

Financial services companies established in 1982
Banks of Hong Kong
Banks of Macau
Interbank networks
Bank of China
Banks established in 1982
1982 establishments in Hong Kong